John Chetwynd, 2nd Viscount Chetwynd (c.1680 – 21 June 1767) was a British diplomat and politician who sat in the House of Commons between 1715 and 1747.

Chetwynd was the second son of John Chetwynd of Ingestre and his wife Lucy Roane, daughter of Robert Roane of Tolhurst Farm, Surrey. In 1699 he was secretary to the Duke of Manchester at Paris until 1701.  He was receiver general for the Duchy of Lancaster from 1702 to 1718. He was secretary at Turin from 1703 to 1706 when he became British envoy to Savoy until 1713.

Chetwynd was appointed a Lord of Trade in 1714 and was returned unopposed as Member of Parliament for St Mawes at the 1715 general election. In 1717 he was sent as British envoy Extraordinary at Madrid to deal with a commercial treaty until the outbreak of the War of the Quadruple Alliance. He was then returned unopposed as MP for Stockbridge at the 1722 general election and was returned again in 1727. However, in 1728 he lost his position as Lord of Trade and in 1734 decided not to stand for parliament.

On the death of his elder brother Walter Chetwynd, 1st Viscount Chetwynd, he succeeded to his Irish title as 2nd Viscount Chetwynd in 1736 by virtue of a special remainder and to his Ingestre estate. He was High Steward of Stafford from 1736 and was returned as MP for Stafford at a by-election on 31 January 1738. He held the seat until 1747.

Chetwynd died on 21 June 1767. He had married about 1716 and with his wife had two sons and two daughters:
John Chetwynd, who died on 30 May 1741 aged 21 and unmarried
William Richard Chetwynd, Member of Parliament for Stafford, who died in 1765 before his father
Catherine Chetwynd, who married John Talbot, the 2nd son of Charles Talbot, 1st Baron Talbot.  By this marriage, the Ingestre estate passed into the Talbot family.
Frances Chetwynd (died unmarried 1805).

Having outlived both his sons, Chetwynd was succeeded as Viscount by his brother William but the Ingestre estate passed to his widowed daughter Catherine Talbot.

References

External links

1680 births
1767 deaths
British MPs 1715–1722
British MPs 1722–1727
British MPs 1727–1734
British MPs 1734–1741
British MPs 1741–1747
Members of the Parliament of Great Britain for Stafford
Viscounts in the Peerage of Ireland
Members of the Parliament of Great Britain for constituencies in Cornwall
Ambassadors of Great Britain to Spain